Baruipur College, established in 1981, is an undergraduate college in Baruipur, West Bengal, India. It is affiliated with the University of Calcutta.

Departments
 Baruipur College is headed by Chanchal Kumar Mandal as the Principal.

Science

Botany
Zoology
Physiology

Arts and Commerce

Bengali
English
History
Geography
Political Science
Philosophy
Economics
Education
Journalism and Mass Communication
Commerce

Accreditation
Baruipur College is recognized by the University Grants Commission (UGC). It has been accredited and awarded C+ grade in 2007, by the National Assessment and Accreditation Council (NAAC).

See also

References

External links
Baruipur College
Home page of former Principal Dr. S. C. Garai

Educational institutions established in 1981
University of Calcutta affiliates
Universities and colleges in South 24 Parganas district
1981 establishments in West Bengal